Ironism (n. ironist; from Greek: eiron, eironeia) is a term coined by Richard Rorty, for the concept that allows rhetorical scholars to actively participate in political practices. It is described as a modernist literary intellectual's project of fashioning the best possible self through continual redescription. With this concept, Rorty argues for a contingency that rejects necessity and universality in relation to the ideas of language, self, and community.

Concept 
In his writings, Rorty cited three conditions that constitute the ironist perspective and these show how the notion undercuts the rationality of conservative, reactionary, and totalitarian positions by maintaining the contingency of all beliefs. These conditions are: 

In Contingency, Irony, and Solidarity, Rorty argues that Proust, Nietzsche, Foucault, Heidegger, Derrida, and Nabokov, among others, all exemplify ironism to different extents. It is also said that ironism and liberalism are compatible, particularly if such liberalism has been altered by pragmatic reductionism.

References

Rorty, Richard. Contingency, Irony, and Solidarity. Cambridge: Cambridge University Press, 1989.
Bacon, Michael. "A Defense of Liberal Ironism." Res Publica. 11.4 (2005): pp 403–423. 
Rolfe, Gary. "Judgements without rules: towards a postmodern ironist concept of research validity." Nursing Inquiry. 13.1 (2006): pp. 7–15. 

Philosophical theories